At least two ships of the British-India Steam Navigation Company have been named SS Mantola:

 was a passenger steamer launched in 1916 and sunk by a German U-boat in 1917.
 was a passenger steamer launched in 1921 and scrapped in 1953.

Ship names